Torodora pegasana is a moth in the family Lecithoceridae. It was described by Chun-Sheng Wu and You-Qiao Liu in 1994. It is found in China (Hainan), Vietnam and Thailand.

The wingspan is about 19 mm. Adults are similar to Torodora aenoptera and Torodora capillaris.

References

Moths described in 1994
Torodora